In connection with modeling languages and especially with goal-oriented modeling, a soft goal is an objective without clear-cut criteria. Soft goals can represent:
 Non-functional requirements
 Relations between non-functional requirements
Non-functional requirements (or quality attributes, qualities, or more colloquially "-ilities") are global qualities of a software system, such as flexibility, maintainability, usability, and so forth. Such requirements are usually stated only informally; and they are often controversial (i.e. management wants a secure system but staff desires user-friendliness). They are also often difficult to validate.

Why soft?
Normally a goal is a very strict and clear logical criterion. It is satisfied when all sub-goals are satisfied. But in non-functional requirements you often need more loosely defined criteria, like satisficeable or unsatisficeable. The term satisficing was first coined by Herbert Simon. Soft goals are goals that do not have a clear-cut criterion for their satisfaction: they are satisficed when there is sufficient positive and little negative evidence for this claim, while they are unsatisficeable in the opposite case.

Relations between soft goals
 Decompositions
 AND
 OR
 Contributions
 Helps (+)
 Hurts (-)
 Makes (++)
 Breaks (--)
 Unknown

References

Further reading 
 Mylopoulos John, Chung Lawrence, Yu Eric: From Object-Oriented to Goal-Oriented Requirements Analysis]

Software requirements